No. 96 Wing (96WG) is a fixed-base support wing of the Royal Australian Air Force (RAAF). 96WG was stood up in 2014 after the renaming of 396ECSW to 96WG. Part of the Combat Support Group, it is responsible for the provision of combat and fixed base support services and, through its subordinate Squadrons, maintains the RAAF's "bare bases" at Weipa, Exmouth and Derby. The wing consists of ten fixed base squadrons, which are located at various bases all around Australia, and in Malaysia at RMAF Butterworth.

References

396